James or Jim Griffiths may refer to:

James Griffiths (Australian politician) (1872–1916), Australian politician
James Griffiths (director), British television and film director
James Griffiths (rugby union) (born 1977), Welsh rugby player
Jim Griffiths (1890–1975), Welsh politician
Jim Griffiths (cricketer) (born 1949), English cricketer
James Griffiths (minister) (1856–1933), Welsh Baptist minister
James Henry Ambrose Griffiths, American prelate of the Roman Catholic Church.

See also
James Griffith (disambiguation)